Rockin' Kats is a platform video game produced by Atlus Software Inc. in 1991 for the Nintendo Entertainment System.  The side-scrolling game involves the adventures of a cartoon cat in his quest to defeat a criminal gang of dogs that has taken over the city.

Plot
The player takes control of Willy, a rising young jazz cat in New York City who goes by the stage name of "The Rockin' Kat."  However, the local crime boss, Mugsy, kidnaps Willy's girlfriend, Jill. To rescue Jill and defeat the gangster, Willy must venture through seven different levels or "channels" (from a television set) that feature various themes, thugs and bosses.

Gameplay

Willy is armed with a punch gun, that he can launch at the various thugs, or to hook onto and swing from. Willy can also use the punch gun to grab and throw certain objects.  Mastering the punch gun is critical to the player's success in the game.

There are a total of five stages. The first four stages can be played in any order and are selected at the start of the game as "channels" on a TV monitor. The fifth and final stage or "channel" becomes available only after the other four have been beaten. The levels include a carnival, a flight atop a moving plane, and a park. There's also a "shopping channel", where the player can buy power-ups with cash obtained through the game. The items include:

 Bomb - Bombs fly from Willy's glove when used
 Twin Balls - Every punch releases two projectile balls
 Hammer Punch - A spiked metal ball replaces the glove
 Jet Sneakers - Can be used with jump to land slowly
 Extra Life - Provides an extra life for Willy

There is also a "bonus channel" where minigames can be played for additional cash and extra lives. The games are:

 Roulette - Willy uses his glove on a roulette wheel and perform a spin attack. Stopping on a specific number wins a prize. 
 Pipe Toss - Willy uses his glove to catch falling balls and then tosses them into moving pipes to earn cash.
 Basketball - Willy uses his glove to perform a super spin jump to toss himself into moving basketball hoops.

A password feature is available that helps the player keep track of their progress.

After the final credits roll, the player is given a chance to play an additional "secret" stage. In it, the player character is stripped of all the money and power-ups acquired, is only given three lives (without a chance to get more) and the stage's levels are vastly more challenging than any of those seen previously in the game and requires complete mastery of the punching gun's functions. In addition to that, the character's health is not replenished after completing a level as it is in the other stages.

Reception

Spanish magazine Super Juegos gave the game 83 for interest, 80 for fun, 79 for graphics, 81 for originality, and 84 for sound. Hobby Consolas, another Spanish magazine, gave the game 69.

Notes

References

External links
NY Nyankies at Wazap 

1991 video games
Atlus games
Nintendo Entertainment System games
Platform games
PlayChoice-10 games
Side-scrolling video games
Single-player video games
Video games about cats
Video games developed in Japan
Video games scored by Tsukasa Masuko
Video games set in New York City